Jeong Yi-kyeong (born 28 February 1985) is a Korean handball player who has competed in the 2008 and 2012 Summer Olympics.

References

External links

1985 births
Living people
South Korean male handball players
Handball players at the 2008 Summer Olympics
Handball players at the 2012 Summer Olympics
Olympic handball players of South Korea
Kyung Hee University alumni
Handball players at the 2010 Asian Games
Handball players at the 2014 Asian Games
Handball players at the 2018 Asian Games
Asian Games gold medalists for South Korea
Asian Games silver medalists for South Korea
Asian Games bronze medalists for South Korea
Asian Games medalists in handball
Medalists at the 2010 Asian Games
Medalists at the 2014 Asian Games
Medalists at the 2018 Asian Games